Christopher John Charles Thacker (14 March 1931 – 27 September 2018) was an English garden historian.

After graduating from Brasenose College, Oxford, and a Phd at the University of Indiana, he was an academic, but never as a garden historian, a field still emerging in his day.  Mostly he taught French literature at Trinity College, Dublin and Reading University. He was the founding editor of the leading academic journal Garden History.

Selected publications
 Masters of the Grotto, Joseph and Josiah Lane (1976)
 The History of Gardens (1979) 
 Of Oxfordshire Gardens (1982)
 The Wildness Pleases; The Origins of Romanticism (1983) 
 England’s Historic Gardens (1989) 
 Historic Garden Tools (1990) 
 The Genius of Gardening (1994) 
 Building Towers, Forming Gardens: Landscaping by Hamilton, Hoare and Beckford (2002)

References

1931 births
2018 deaths
English garden writers
People from Bishop's Cleeve
Academics of the University of Reading
Alumni of Brasenose College, Oxford
English Heritage
Indiana University alumni